Skin is the second album by Australian electronica artist, Endorphin, released in 1999, which peaked at No. 32 on the ARIA Albums Chart. At the ARIA Music Awards of 2000 Endorphin was nominated for Best Male Artist for this album.

Track listing

Skin
"Blue Moon (The Cosmix/Radio Edit)" - 3:44
"Anguish" - 3:28
"Passage" - 3:57
"Afterwords" - 3:44
"Higher" - 4:19
"Time" - 4:37
"Red" - 4:06
"Skin" - 3:37
"Grey" - 3:41
"Heat" - 3:21
"Radio Funk" - 3:07
"Zoe" - 13:28

Re-Embrace (Bonus Disc)
"Free (Free Range Mix)" - 4:53
"Solar Flare (Disaster Area Remix)" - 4:05
"Satie (Remember Satie Radio Edit)" - 4:10
"Relapse (Our House Remix)" - 6:43
"Satie (Astral Project Remix)" - 6:56

References

External links
 Endorphinmusic.com Official website
  Album information at Australian Music Online

1999 albums
Epic Records albums
Endorphin (Australian band) albums